Schaberg is an unincorporated community in Crawford County, in the U.S. state of Arkansas.

History
Variant names were "Frisco", "Porter" and "Porter Station". The town site was platted as "Porter" in 1885, soon after the St. Louis–San Francisco Railway was extended to that point. A post office called Frisco was established in 1883, the name was changed to Schaberg in 1912, and the post office closed in 1950.

References

Unincorporated communities in Crawford County, Arkansas